Robert Alexander "Frog" Lindsay (March 6, 1885 – December 16, 1964) was an American Negro league shortstop in 1909 and 1910.

A native of Lexington, Missouri, Lindsay was the brother of fellow Negro leaguer Bill Lindsay. He played for the Kansas City Giants in 1909 and 1910. Lindsay died in Columbia, Missouri in 1964 at age 79.

References

External links
Baseball statistics and player information from Baseball-Reference Black Baseball Stats and Seamheads

1885 births
1964 deaths
Kansas City Giants players
Baseball shortstops
Baseball players from Missouri
People from Lexington, Missouri